Kevin Murphy is an Australian-born hairdresser. His KEVIN.MURPHY hair care company develops hair care products, often based on products originally designed for skin care. Murphy won a D&AD design award for packaging design for his products.  He has worked at Australia's Fashion Week, and gives tips on current hairstyles. He has been the stylist for covers of Vogue and InStyle magazines. He also worked as the Hair Director for Melbourne Spring Fashion Week for 12 consecutive years.

Kevin was the recipient of the Master Award at the 2007 Australian Hair Fashion Awards.

References 

Australian hairdressers
Vogue (magazine)
Year of birth missing (living people)
Living people